Jeffrey Alan Rawle (born 20 July 1951) is an English actor. He is known for portraying George Dent in the news-gathering sitcom Drop the Dead Donkey. He also portrayed Silas Blissett in Hollyoaks from December 2010 until 2012. Rawle returned to Hollyoaks in 2016, 2020 and 2022.

Early life
Rawle was born on 20 July 1951 in Birmingham, West Midlands, England. His first secondary school was King Edward VI School in Aston, Birmingham. When he was 15 his family moved to Sheffield, and it was at High Storrs Grammar School that he first became interested in drama when he appeared in school plays. He worked at the Sheffield Playhouse before training at LAMDA.

Career
Rawle landed his first major role in 1973 as Billy in the television version of Keith Waterhouse and Willis Hall's Billy Liar. In 1979, he appeared with Ian McKellen and Tom Bell in Bent at the Criterion Theatre, London. In 1984, he appeared in the Doctor Who story Frontios as the character Plantaganet. He appeared in Faith in the Future on ITV from 1995 to 1998. In 2004, Rawle began appearing in the ITV series Doc Martin as Roger Fenn. The actor went on to make a guest appearance in the fourth episode of the fourth series of New Tricks as lawyer Jonathan Blunt. The following year, he starred in the fourth series of Spooks as the Home Secretary. He also appeared in Ultimate Force – "Never Go Back" alongside Ross Kemp.

Rawle portrayed Amos Diggory, father to Cedric Diggory (Robert Pattinson), in Harry Potter and the Goblet of Fire. 2008 saw Rawle play Gilbert Murray in the National Theatre's production of Tony Harrison's play Fram. The following year, he guested in The Bill and appeared in The Sarah Jane Adventures on CBBC. During 2010, Rawle joined the cast of Hollyoaks in the role of serial killer Silas Blissett. He stated that he was delighted to be playing such a sinister character. He has won various awards for his portrayal of Silas. He initially left the role in 2012 before making guest returns from January to May 2016, October 2020 to January 2021. He reprised the role in September 2022, where his character was finally killed off by his grandson, Bobby.

In October 2012, it was announced Rawle had joined the cast of Doctors as Rory Bishton, a road sweeper with something to hide. Rawle made his screen debut as Rory in early 2013. He had previously appeared in the series in 2004.

Rawle has provided numerous narrations including A Bear Called Paddington, three series of the Duchess of York's Budgie the Little Helicopter, Stephen Hawking's Universe and Tom Fort's The Grass is Always Greener for BBC Radio 4. Rawle's writing credits include The Young Poisoner's Handbook in 1995 and Who Goes There?

Filmography and television

References

External links

1951 births
Living people
20th-century English male actors
21st-century English male actors
Alumni of the London Academy of Music and Dramatic Art
English male film actors
English male stage actors
English male television actors
English male voice actors
Male actors from Birmingham, West Midlands
People educated at High Storrs Grammar School for Boys
Politicians from Sheffield